Joel Myerson (September 9, 1945 - November 19, 2021) was a Distinguished Professor Emeritus of English Language and Literature at the University of South Carolina. He edited many books about the works of such American literary figures as Ralph Waldo Emerson, Henry David Thoreau, Nathaniel Hawthorne, Louisa May Alcott, Emily Dickinson, and Walt Whitman. 

He served as President of the Ralph Waldo Emerson Society and the Thoreau Society.

Education
Ph.D., Northwestern University, 1971

External links
 University of South Carolina, English Department Faculty Page

1945 births
Living people
American academics of English literature